Michael Goi (born March 4, 1959) is an American cinematographer and film director.

He is well known for his work on Showtimes Web Therapy, and for his work with Ryan Murphy and Brad Falchuk on Glee, Scream Queens and American Horror Story. He also wrote and directed the 2011 film Megan Is Missing.

Career
He began his career as director of photography on a short horror film directed by John Strysik, The Music of Erich Zann, in 1980; and then on the comedy The Blues Brothers, as a production assistant. He went on to serve as cinematographer on film and television series, such as: Moonstalker, How U Like Me Now, What Matters Most, Call Waiting, Funky Monkey, Cloud 9, Witness Protection, My Name is Earl, The Nine Lives of Chloe King, Mr. Sunshine, Salem and The Town That Dreaded Sundown

Goi has written and directed three feature films during his career; Voyeur, an action drama about a reluctant porn star and her biggest fan; Megan Is Missing (2011), about internet predators and the disappearance of Megan Stewart (Rachel Quinn); and "MARY" starring Gary Oldman and Emily Mortimer, on which he also served as the cinematographer.

Web Therapy
Goi served as the exclusive cinematographer on Lisa Kudrows Web Therapy throughout the entirety of its 87-episode run.

Work with Ryan Murphy
As director of photography, Goi first worked with prolific writer/producers Ryan Murphy and Brad Falchuk on their (with Ian Brennan) FOX musical comedy Glee, in 2011, with the episode "Asian F". That same year he also began work on the duo's new FX series American Horror Story. His first episode on the series was the Murder House installment "Rubber Man". He went on to work on Murphy's short-lived NBC comedy The New Normal; and the trio's 2015 horror/comedy Scream Queens. During the fourth season of American Horror Story, Goi made his series directorial debut with "Magical Thinking". He served as the series' exclusive cinematographer from the premiere of Asylum, until the end of the fifth season. He was succeeded in the capacity by Breaking Bads Nelson Cragg, with the commencement of the sixth year.

Filmography

Director

References

External links

1959 births
American cinematographers
American film directors
American television directors
Living people